Ruisbroek is a village in the municipality of Puurs-Sint-Amands located in the Antwerp Province of Belgium.

Ruisbroek was an independent municipality until 1977 was merged into Puurs. In 2019, Puurs itself was merged into Puurs-Sint-Amands.

Floods

Ruisbroek is a polder village protected by dikes which has often seen severe flooding. In 1820, a whole neighbourhood was flooded, and was rebuilt north of the Rupel River. The last flood which occurred was a result of the gale of January 1976. The dike broke over a distance of 100 metres, and flooded part of the village. King Baudouin of Belgium visited the town on 6 January 1976. During his visit he was confronted with an angry crowd and accusations. De Waterhoek monument indicates the height the water reached.

References

External links 
 

Populated places in Antwerp Province
Puurs-Sint-Amands